Wu Chengshu (born 26 August 1996 in Jiangyin) is a female Chinese football player, who is a member of the China squad for 2022 AFC Women's Asian Cup.

International goals

See also
Football in China

References

Chinese women's footballers
Living people
1996 births
Canberra United FC players
Place of birth missing (living people)
Women's association footballers not categorized by position